In six-dimensional geometry, a runcinated 6-cube is a convex uniform 6-polytope with 3rd order truncations (runcination) of the regular 6-cube.

There are 12 unique runcinations of the 6-cube with permutations of truncations, and cantellations. Half are expressed relative to the dual 6-orthoplex.

Runcinated 6-cube

Alternate names
 Small prismated hexeract  (spox) (Jonathan Bowers)

Images

Biruncinated 6-cube

Alternate names
 Small biprismated hexeractihexacontatetrapeton (sobpoxog) (Jonathan Bowers)

Images

Runcitruncated 6-cube

Alternate names
 Prismatotruncated hexeract (potax) (Jonathan Bowers)

Images

Biruncitruncated 6-cube

Alternate names
 Biprismatotruncated hexeract (boprag) (Jonathan Bowers)

Images

Runcicantellated 6-cube

Alternate names
 Prismatorhombated hexeract (prox) (Jonathan Bowers)

Images

Runcicantitruncated 6-cube

Alternate names
 Great prismated hexeract (gippox) (Jonathan Bowers)

Images

Biruncitruncated 6-cube

Alternate names
 Biprismatotruncated hexeract (boprag) (Jonathan Bowers)

Images

Related polytopes

These polytopes are from a set of 63 uniform 6-polytopes generated from the B6 Coxeter plane, including the regular 6-cube or 6-orthoplex.

Notes

References
 H.S.M. Coxeter: 
 H.S.M. Coxeter, Regular Polytopes, 3rd Edition, Dover New York, 1973 
 Kaleidoscopes: Selected Writings of H.S.M. Coxeter, edited by F. Arthur Sherk, Peter McMullen, Anthony C. Thompson, Asia Ivic Weiss, Wiley-Interscience Publication, 1995,  
 (Paper 22) H.S.M. Coxeter, Regular and Semi Regular Polytopes I, [Math. Zeit. 46 (1940) 380-407, MR 2,10]
 (Paper 23) H.S.M. Coxeter, Regular and Semi-Regular Polytopes II, [Math. Zeit. 188 (1985) 559-591]
 (Paper 24) H.S.M. Coxeter, Regular and Semi-Regular Polytopes III, [Math. Zeit. 200 (1988) 3-45]
 Norman Johnson Uniform Polytopes, Manuscript (1991)
 N.W. Johnson: The Theory of Uniform Polytopes and Honeycombs, Ph.D. 
  o3o3x3o3o4x - spox, o3x3o3o3x4o - sobpoxog, o3o3x3o3x4x - potax, o3x3o3x3x4o - boprag, o3o3x3x3o4x - prox, o3o3x3x3x4x - gippox, o3x3x3x3x4o - boprag

External links 
 
 Polytopes of Various Dimensions
 Multi-dimensional Glossary

6-polytopes